The 1888 United States presidential election in Virginia took place on November 6, 1888, as part of the 1888 United States presidential election. Voters chose 12 representatives, or electors to the Electoral College, who voted for president and vice president.

Virginia voted for the Democratic candidate, incumbent President Grover Cleveland over the Republican candidate, former U.S. Senator Benjamin Harrison. The contest in Virginia was very close and Cleveland narrowly won the state by a margin of just 0.53%. This was the closest the Republican Party came to winning an ex-Confederate state between the Compromise of 1877 and Warren G. Harding’s win in Tennessee, and was effectively the last election with the expanded Reconstruction Era electorate. So complete was to be the disfranchisement of Virginia's lower classes with the new Constitution of 1902 that it was 1952, with a much larger population, before the electorate returned to the same numbers observed in 1888.

Results

Results by county

Notes

References

Virginia
1888
1888 Virginia elections